is a naginatajutsu koryū which claims to have descended from Kashima Shinden Jikishinkage-ryū. Despite this claim, Jikishinkage-ryū naginatajutsu  does not appear to have any of the original rituals, esoteric teachings, body and weapon movements of Kashima Shinden Jikishinkage-ryū.

Sometime during the 1860s, Satake Kanryūsai (佐竹鑑柳斎) and his wife, Satake Shigeo (佐竹茂雄) developed a new naginata style which eventually came to be known as Jikishinkage-ryū naginatajutsu. In the Bugei Ryūha Daijiten (武芸流派大事典), the name of this school is also rendered as Jikishin-ryū-kage-ryū (直心柳影流)
. It is usually claimed that Satake Kanryūsai was an exponent of Kashima Shinden Jikishinkage-ryū (鹿島神傳直心影流) and Yanagikage-ryū (柳影流). However it is believed by some that Ryūgō-ryū (柳剛流) was instead the main influence of Jikishinkage-ryū naginatajutsu, as Ryūgō-ryū was famous for using very long shinai (120 - 183 cm in length) as well as attacks to the lower legs, a technique which Jikishinkage-ryū naginatajutsu itself became famous for. Additionally, the way the naginata is held in Jikishinkage-ryū naginatajutsu appears to resemble that of a sword rather than a heavy pole weapon.

The school's main curriculum consists of twenty-five naginata kata and ten tantō kata. In addition, there are five secret naginata gokui-waza (極意技) and four kata forming the reiken-shihō-kiri (霊剣四方切). Ten kusarigama kata from Chokuyūshin-ryū (直猶心流) are also transmitted together with the naginata kata.

Jikishinkage-ryū naginatajutsu and Tendō-ryū are the two main classical schools of naginatajutsu which the modern practice atarashii naginata is mainly derived from.

References

Ko-ryū bujutsu
Japanese martial arts